Harry Grant (born 17 February 1998) is an Australian professional rugby league footballer who plays as a  for the Melbourne Storm in the NRL and Australia at international level.

Grant played for the Wests Tigers on loan for the 2020 NRL season. The arrangement between Wests and the Storm to trade Grant with Paul Momirovski was the first loan arrangement in National Rugby League history. 

He has played at representative level for Queensland in State of Origin.

Early life
Grant was born in Rockhampton, Queensland, Australia and educated at St. Brendan's College, Yeppoon.

Grant played his junior rugby league for the Yeppoon Seagulls.

Playing career

2016 - 2017: Early career
Grant played for the Melbourne Storm Holden Cup team from 2016 to 2017, scoring 9 tries and playing 21 games.

While playing for Melbourne Storm National Youth Competition, he also made appearances for Sunshine Coast Falcons in the Queensland Instrust Super Cup. At the seasons end at Rugby League Players Association Awards night he was recipient of the National Youth Competition player of the year award.

2018 - 2019: NRL Debut and further development
He made his NRL debut for the Melbourne Storm in their Round 11 match against Manly-Warringah . He had his Melbourne jersey (cap number 188) presented to him by Melbourne captain Cameron Smith.

In 2019, Grant spent the majority of the season playing for the Sunshine Coast Falcons in the Queensland Cup, taking them to the minor premiership and earning a spot in the Queensland Cup Team of the Year. He was also named the Falcons Player of the Year, winning the James Ackerman Medal. 

In Round 25 he made his second NRL appearance, coming off the bench in Melbourne's 24–16 win over North Queensland.

2020: Wests Tigers Loan
During the lead up to the 2020 NRL season the Wests Tigers and Melbourne Storm attempted to arrange a temporary player swap between Grant and Wests Tigers player Paul Momirovski. The primary catalyst of this was Wests Tigers requiring reinforcements at Grant's preferred position of hooker due to the retirement of Robbie Farah and long-term injury to Wests Tigers preferred replacement Jacob Liddle. Grant, being Melbourne's third choice at his preferred position behind Melbourne Storm captain Cameron Smith and New Zealand Kiwis international hooker Brandon Smith was receptive to the move and began to push for it himself. Initially the NRL salary cap administrators refused to process the request because Melbourne would have gone over the salary cap if the deal had been processed at that time.

After the NRL initially rejected the arrangement Grant requested an immediate release from his Melbourne contract in the hopes of joining the Wests Tigers as soon as possible though this did not eventuate.

There were further delays due to injury to Brandon Smith causing Melbourne to hold up proceedings so they could have Grant provide back up to Cameron Smith in the early rounds of the season, and briefly by Momirovski wishing to sign a new contract with Wests Tigers prior to leaving, but the deal was finally made official during round 2 of the season on March 21, 2020. This deal was the first of its kind in the NRL.

Grant was selected in the Queensland 27 man squad for the 2020 State of Origin series, Grant debut in Game 3 of the series in a 20-14 win scoring the match sealing try winning the series 2-1.

2021 - present: Regular game time and National debut
Despite missing a number of games through injury, Grant was selected in the Queensland team for Game 1 of the 2021 State of Origin series.
Grant played a total of 15 games for Melbourne in the 2021 NRL season as the club won 19 matches in a row and claimed the Minor Premiership.  Grant played both finals matches including the preliminary final where Melbourne suffered a shock 10-6 loss against eventual premiers Penrith.

In October Grant was named in the Australia squad for the 2021 Rugby League World Cup.

Grant played for Australia in their 2021 Rugby League World Cup final victory over Samoa.

In November he was named in the 2021 RLWC Team of the Tournament.

In the opening game of the 2023 NRL season against the Parramatta Eels, Grant scored the first golden point try in Melbourne Storm history.

Awards
Competition
 Queensland Cup: 
 2019 – Team of the Year
 NRL Dally M Awards:
 2020 – Rookie of the Year
 Rugby League Players Association:
 2017 – NYC Player of the Year
 2020 – Rookie of the Year
Club
 Sunshine Coast Falcons
 2019 – James Ackerman Medal (Player of the Year)
 Melbourne Storm
 2017 – Darren Bell Under 20s Player of the Year
 2019 – Cooper Cronk Feeder Play of the Year
 2022 – Best Forward
  Wests Tigers
 2020 – Rookie of the Year

References

External links
Melbourne Storm profile

1998 births
Living people
Australia national rugby league team players
Australian rugby league players
Melbourne Storm players
Queensland Rugby League State of Origin players
Rugby league hookers
Rugby league players from Rockhampton, Queensland
Wests Tigers players
Sunshine Coast Falcons players